Count of Fontanar is a hereditary title in the Peerage of Spain, granted in 1645 by Philip IV to Cristóbal Benavente, Ambassador in France, Venice and England.

Counts of Fontanar (1645)

 Cristóbal Benavente y Benavides, 1st Count of Fontanar
 Melchor Benavente y Benavides, 2nd Count of Fontanar
 Teresa de Benavente y Benavides, 3rd Countess of Fontanar
 Alejo de Guzmán y Pacheco, 4th Count of Fontanar
 Ignacio Pimentel y Borja, 5th Count of Fontanar
 Francisco de Borja Téllez-Girón y Pimentel, 6th Count of Fontanar
 Pedro de Alcantara Téllez-Girón y Beaufort Spontin, 7th Count of Fontanar
 Mariano Téllez-Girón y Beaufort Spontin, 8th Count of Fontanar
 Francisco Carvajal y Hurtado de Mendoza, 9th Count of Fontanar
 Francisco de Borja Carvajal y Xifré, 10th Count of Fontanar
 Ignacio Juan Carvajal y Urquijo, 11th Count of Fontanar
 Francisco de Borja Carvajal y Argüelles, 12th Count of Fontanar
 Juan Carvajal y Argüelles, 13th Count of Fontanar

References

Bibliography
 

Counts of Spain
Lists of counts
Lists of Spanish nobility
Noble titles created in 1645